Unbroken is the fifth studio album from Fiona.  After being persuaded to rejoin the ranks of the music industry (following a two decade hiatus) by producer James Christian, singer Robin Beck and guitarist Tommy Denander, Fiona released the album on October 17, 2011 via Life on the Moon Records.

Track listing 
 "Loved Along the Way"	3:33
 "Broken"	3:53
 "I've Released You"	3:14
 "Shadows Of The Night"	3:11
 "Badge of Love"	4:17
 "Wild One"	3:13
 "This Heart" (featuring Robin Beck)	3:27
 "Get Yer Kix"	3:23
 "Salt On My Wings"	4:40
 "I Love You But Shut Up"	3:17
 "Everything You Are"	4:22

Personnel 
 Robin Beck
 James Christian
 Tommy Denander
 Holly Knight
 Bobby Messano
 Marc Tanner

References 

Fiona (singer) albums
2011 albums